Alapaha Rise, also known as Shelley Run, is the largest single spring in the United States. The Alapaha Rise is located in Hamilton County, Florida. It drains into the Suwannee River about 1/3 mile upstream from where the Alapaha River meets the river. It is a First Magnitude spring, with high tannic levels.

References

Springs of Florida
Landforms of Hamilton County, Florida